Shambhala International is the umbrella organization that encompasses many of the distinct institutions of the Shambhala spiritual community, founded by the students of the Tibetan Buddhist teacher Chögyam Trungpa Rinpoche.

Based in Halifax, Nova Scotia, Shambhala International links a worldwide network of urban Buddhist meditation centers and retreat centers, as well as a Western Buddhist monastery and other institutions.

Scope and Function
Shambhala International functions to support the activities of the Shambhala spiritual community. It is led by an independent Board of Directors, who manage a central administrative team called Shambhala Global Services that offers infrastructure and support to the community globally.

Shambhala International supports more than 150 Shambhala Centres and Groups, which are meditation communities of varying sizes in cities and towns across North and South America, Europe, and Oceania.

It also supports several retreat centers and other organizations. Below is a partial list of organizations affiliated with or managed within Shambhala International:

 Karmê Chöling (retreat center in Barnet, VT, USA)
 Dechen Chöling (retreat center in Limoges, France)
 Drala Mountain Center (retreat center in Red Feather Lakes, CO, USA)
 Casa Werma (retreat center in Pátzcuaro, México)
 Dorje Denma Ling (retreat center in Tatamagouche, Nova Scotia, Canada)
 Gampo Abbey (Buddhist monastery)
 Nalanda Translation Committee (Buddhist translation committee)
 Shambhala Archives (archival footage, teachings, and materials)

History and Leadership

Foundation and Leadership by Chögyam Trungpa Rinpoche
In 1970, Chögyam Trungpa Rinpoche arrived in North America. The first established center of his teachings was "Tail of the Tiger" in Barnet, Vermont (now Karmê Chöling). A second branch of the community began to form when Rinpoche began teaching at the University of Colorado. The Rocky Mountain Dharma Center was established, now known as Drala Mountain Center, near Red Feather Lakes, Colorado.

In the early 1970s, the community grew rapidly and attracted the involvement of notable figures such as Allen Ginsberg and Anne Waldman. In 1973, the community was incorporated in Colorado as Vajradhatu. Vajradhatu hosted visits by the Sixteenth Karmapa (head of the Karma Kagyu lineage of Tibetan Buddhism) in 1974, Dilgo Khyentse Rinpoche (head of the Nyingma lineage of Tibetan Buddhism) in 1976, and the Fourteenth Dalai Lama in 1981.

In 1974, Naropa Institute was founded, a contemplative studies and liberal arts college, now fully accredited as Naropa University.

Beginning in 1976, Chögyam Trungpa Rinpoche presented a series of teachings known as the Shambhala teachings to the community. These teachings presented the principle of basic goodness, and a secular rather than religious approach to enlightenment. They were encoded into a Shambhala Training series offered widely throughout the community. In 1979, Trungpa Rinpoche empowered his eldest son, Ösel Rangdröl Mukpo, as his successor and heir to the Shambhala lineage.

In 1986, Trungpa moved the international headquarters of Vajradhatu to Halifax, Nova Scotia. A large number of his students emigrated from the United States to Nova Scotia along with him.

Leadership by Ösel Tendzin
In 1987, one year after moving the organization to Nova Scotia, Trungpa Rinpoche died of illnesses related to long-term alcohol abuse. He was 47. A senior American student named Thomas Rich, whom Trungpa Rinpoche had given the title Vajra Regent Ösel Tendzin, assumed leadership of the organization. Tendzin acted as spiritual head of Vajradhatu until around 1989. In December 1988, the community learned Tendzin had passed HIV to a male partner in the Colorado congregation, who in turn unknowingly infected his female partner. Tendzin, who was HIV-positive, knowingly had sex with students for three years without disclosing his infection, believing that his spiritual practice protected himself and others from AIDS. It eventually came out that the Vajradhatu board of directors had known of the problem for more than two years and had done nothing about it.

Tendzin died in 1990 from HIV/AIDS, and Ösel Rangdröl Mukpo, now known as Sakyong Mipham Rinpoche, assumed spiritual and executive leadership of Vajradhatu.

Leadership by Sakyong Mipham Rinpoche
Sakyong Mipham Rinpoche renamed the organization to Shambhala International in 2000, and led it through a range of organizational forms. Also beginning in 2000, Sakyong Mipham Rinpoche moved to enclose the previously secular teachings of Shambhala within the container of a new Buddhist lineage, known as Shambhala Buddhism.

In early 2018, allegations surfaced of sexual misconduct and misuse of power by Sakyong Mipham Rinpoche toward his students. Following a series of reports by an initiative called Buddhist Project Sunshine on sexual misconduct within Shambhala International, the sitting board, known as the Kalapa Council, resigned. Sakyong Mipham Rinpoche stepped back from his teaching and governance roles, and has not acted in a spiritual or executive leadership role within Shambhala International since that time. Shambhala International hired a law firm to investigate the allegations, and in February 2019 the investigator issued a report of its findings, which included finding a pattern of sexual misconduct and at least one credible incident of sexual assault by Sakyong Mipham.

Leadership by Shambhala Board
In late 2018, a Shambhala Board of community members assumed executive leadership of the organization. It has claimed to implement some of the third-party recommendations for addressing community harm, including instituting a new Shambhala code of conduct.

In February 2022, the Shambhala Board reached a mediated agreement with Sakyong Mipham Rinpoche that he would no longer hold administrative responsibilities in Shambhala International, and the organization's bylaws were amended to establish the Shambhala Board as an independent leadership body.

References

External links

Buddhist organizations
Religious organizations established in 1990
Shambhala vision